= MotorGrrl =

New york motorcycle business

MotorGrrl is a motorcycle business based in Brooklyn, New York, founded in 2004. The shop is a licensed New York State repair facility and inspection facility. Besides selling parts and servicing motorcycles, the shop also sells memberships for people to work on and repair their own motorcycles. The founder, Valerie Figarella, said she turned her hobby into a business after her first career as computer programmer was interrupted during the dot-com crash.
